Kole District is a district in Northern Uganda. Like most other Ugandan districts, it is named after its 'chief town', Kole, where the district headquarters are located.

Location
Kole District is bordered by Lira District to the east, Apac District to the south and Oyam District to the west and north. The coordinates of the district are:02 24N, 32 48E.

Overview
Kole District was created by Act of Parliament and became operational on 1 July 2010. Prior to then, it was part of Apac District. The district is part of Lango sub-region, home to an estimated 1.5 million people, in 2002, according to the national census. The sub-region comprises the following districts: (a) Alebtong District (b) Amolatar District (c) Apac District (d) Dokolo District (e) Kole District (f) Lira District (g) Otuke District and (h) Oyam District. Kole district is subdivided into the following sub-counties: 1. Aboke 2. Akalo 3. Alito 4. Ayer and 5. Bala

Population
The 2002 national census estimated the population of the district at about 165,900. The population of the district, was estimated at 231,900 as of July 2012.

Tea_boke

Teboke See also
 Kole
 Lango sub-region
 Northern Region, Uganda
 Districts of Uganda

References

External links
Kole District Internet Portal

 
Lango sub-region
Districts of Uganda
Northern Region, Uganda